Waldo Emerson Don Carlos (October 16, 1909 – June 18, 1997) was an American football center for the Green Bay Packers of the National Football League (NFL). He played college football for Drake. He won an NFL championship with the Packers in 1931.

Biography
Carlos was born on October 16, 1909 in Greenfield, Iowa.

Career
Carlos played with the Green Bay Packers during the 1931 NFL season. As such, he was a member of the 1931 NFL Champion Packers. He had previously played at the collegiate level at Drake University.

Carlos was the fourth Latin American in the history of the NFL to play on a team.

See also
List of Green Bay Packers players

References

1909 births
1997 deaths
People from Greenfield, Iowa
Green Bay Packers players
American football centers
Drake University alumni
Drake Bulldogs football players
Players of American football from Iowa